Fichardt is a surname. Notable people with the surname include:

Charles Fichardt (1870–1923), South African cricketer 
Darren Fichardt (born 1975), South African golfer 
Gustav Fichardt (born 1965), South African tennis player and coach